Thymus algeriensis is a species of flowering plant in the family Lamiaceae. It is native to North Africa, from Morocco to Libya. A widespread species, it is used locally as a culinary herb, both fresh and dried.

References

algeriensis
Herbs
Flora of Morocco
Flora of Algeria
Flora of Tunisia
Flora of Libya
Plants described in 1852